Hassan Abdullah al-Ibrahim (Arabic:  حسن عبد الله الابراهيم) was a Syrian Brigadier General who was shot and killed, along with a Lieutenant during the course of the Syrian Civil War, according to the state media. State media reported that his vehicle was fired upon when it entered the Talfita area of Damascus, and three other military officers were injured in the attack. A blurred photo of what was reportedly the body of the general was included in SANA's report. His death came after the death of Mohammed al-Awwad, another Brigadier General, almost a week before.

References

Year of birth missing
2012 deaths
Syrian military personnel killed in action
Terrorism deaths in Syria
Deaths by firearm in Syria
Military personnel killed in the Syrian civil war
Assassinated Syrian people
Assassinated military personnel
Syrian generals